The 1873 Boston Red Stockings season was the 3rd season of the franchise. They won their second consecutive National Association championship.

Managed by Harry Wright, Boston finished with a record of 43–16 to win the pennant by 4 games. Pitcher Al Spalding started 54 of the Red Stockings' games and led the NA with 41 wins. Second baseman Ross Barnes won the league batting title with a .431 batting average, and catcher Deacon White topped the circuit with 77 runs batted in.

Harry Wright, Al Spalding, first baseman Jim O'Rourke, and shortstop George Wright have all been elected into the Baseball Hall of Fame.

Regular season

Season standings

Record vs. opponents

Roster

Player stats

Batting

Starters by position
Note: Pos = Position; G = Games played; AB = At bats; H = Hits; Avg. = Batting average; HR = Home runs; RBI = Runs batted in

Other batters
Note: G = Games played; AB = At bats; H = Hits; Avg. = Batting average; HR = Home runs; RBI = Runs batted in

Pitching

Starting pitchers
Note: G = Games pitched; IP = Innings pitched; W = Wins; L = Losses; ERA = Earned run average; SO = Strikeouts

Relief pitchers
Note: G = Games pitched; IP = Innings pitched; W = Wins; L = Losses; ERA = Earned run average; SO = Strikeouts

References 

1873 Boston Red Stockings season at Baseball Reference

Boston Red Stockings seasons
Boston Red Stockings
Boston Red Stockings
Boston Red Stockings
19th century in Boston